Tylosis nigricollis is a species of beetle in the family Cerambycidae. It was described by Chemsak & Hovore in 2010.

References

Trachyderini
Beetles described in 2010